Anna Grodzka (born 16 March 1954) is a Polish politician. A trans woman, she was elected to the Sejm in the 2011 Polish parliamentary elections as a candidate for the left-liberal Palikot's Movement, and was the first openly transgender Member of Parliament in Poland, and the third openly transgender member of a national parliament worldwide, after Georgina Beyer (in office 1999–2005) and Vladimir Luxuria (2006–2008). She was believed to be the only remaining transgender member of parliament until Nikki Sinclaire (in office 2009–2015) outed herself in November 2013.

In June 2014, Anna Grodzka joined Poland's Green Party but left a year later. In 2019 she became a member of PPS, which she also left soon after criticizing the party's chairman.

Biography
Grodzka was born in 1954 at Otwock, near Warsaw. Before openly transitioning, she was married (wife: Grażyna) and had a son. She transitioned in 2009 after divorcing in 2007.

Grodzka was a member of the Polish United Workers' Party at Warsaw University and a political instructor in the Polish Union of Students. Later on she was an entrepreneur and worked in publishing, print industry, and filmmaking.

In 2008 she co-founded and became the first president of the Trans-Fuzja Foundation, which works to improve the living conditions of transgender people in Poland and support them and their relatives through the transition process. The foundation offers psychological support and provides legal advice for judicial gender reassignment and other legal aspects of transition.

References

External links
 (Polish)

1954 births
Living people
Your Movement politicians
People from Otwock
Transgender politicians
Transgender women
Polish transgender people
Members of the Polish Sejm 2011–2015
Women members of the Sejm of the Republic of Poland
Polish United Workers' Party members
21st-century Polish women politicians
Candidates in the 2015 Polish presidential election
Polish LGBT businesspeople
Polish LGBT politicians
Polish LGBT rights activists
The Greens (Poland) politicians
LGBT legislators
20th-century Polish women
20th-century Polish LGBT people
21st-century Polish LGBT people